Alba Aznar Martí (born 2 September 1993) is a Spanish footballer who plays as a midfielder for Alavés.

Club career
Aznar started her career at Gimnàstic de Tarragona.

References

External links
Profile at La Liga

1993 births
Living people
Women's association football midfielders
Spanish women's footballers
People from Reus
Sportspeople from the Province of Tarragona
Footballers from Catalonia
FC Barcelona Femení players
Zaragoza CFF players
Levante UD Femenino players
Deportivo Alavés Gloriosas players
Primera División (women) players
Segunda Federación (women) players
Sportswomen from Catalonia